Bateaux Mouches are open excursion boats that provide visitors to Paris, France, with a view of the city from along the river Seine.
They also operate on Parisian canals such as Canal Saint-Martin which is partially subterranean.

The term is a registered trademark of the Compagnie des Bateaux Mouches, the most widely known operator of the boats in Paris, founded by Jean Bruel (1917–2003); however, the phrase, because of the success of the company, is used generically to refer to all such boats operating on the river within the city. Bateaux Mouches translates literally as "fly boats" ("fly" meaning the insect);  however, the name arose because they were originally manufactured in boatyards situated in the Mouche area of Lyon.

These boats are popular tourist attractions in Paris. They started with steamers at an Exhibition in 1867. Many seat several hundred people, often with an open upper deck and an enclosed lower deck; some have sliding canopies that can close to protect the open deck in inclement weather. Most boat tours include a live or recorded commentary on the sights along the river. A typical cruise lasts about one hour. Many companies offer lunch and dinner cruises as well. Most boats are equipped with lights to illuminate landmarks in the evening. The Steamers stopped running in the slow down of the Great Depression.

Since the Seine is centrally situated in Paris, a boat tour covers a great deal of the city. Both the Left Bank (Rive Gauche) and the Right Bank (Rive Droite) are visible from the boat. Passengers can see, among other sites, the Eiffel Tower; Notre-Dame Cathedral; the Alexander III Bridge, the Pont Neuf; the Orsay Museum, and the Louvre Museum. Passengers can also see Les Invalides, Napoleon's burial site.

Boat tours in Paris have flourished since World War II, and today the Compagnie des Bateaux Mouches (still the oldest company operating boat tours) has significant competition. On busy days during high season, boats constantly move up and down the river.

In Canada, Montréal (Québec)
A Canadian company runs a tour of the Saint Lawrence River around Montreal with a similar boat called the "Bateau-Mouche of the Old Port of Montréal".

Kingston 1000 Island Cruises, in Kingston, Ontario, Canada operates "Le Bateau Mouche II" for lunch and dinner cruises of the 1000 Islands. The vessel is referred to unofficially for marketing purposes as the "Island Star".

References

External links

Compagnie des Bateaux Mouches

Tourist attractions in Paris
Boat types
Transport in Paris